Robert K. "Bob" Casey (July 22, 1931 – June 7, 2015) was an American physician and politician.

Born in Paducah, Kentucky. Casey lived with his family in Gainesville, Florida. Casey served in the United States Marine Corps during the Korean War. He received his bachelor's degree from Baylor University and his medical degree from the University of Florida. Casey served in the Florida House of Representatives from 1992 to 2000 and was a Republican.

References

1931 births
2015 deaths
University of Florida alumni
Republican Party members of the Florida House of Representatives
Physicians from Florida
People from Gainesville, Florida
People from Paducah, Kentucky
Military personnel from Florida
Baylor University alumni
20th-century American politicians
20th-century American physicians
Physicians from Kentucky